Events from the year 1921 in Romania. The year saw the formation of the Romanian Communist Party out of the   Socialist Party and subsequent imprisonment of the Communist leadership.

Incumbents
 King: Ferdinand.
 Prime Minister:
 Alexandru Averescu (until 17 December).
 Take Ionescu (from 17 December).

Events
 2 February – Nicolae Bretan's opera Luceafărul is first performed at Romanian National Opera, Cluj-Napoca.
 February – Elena Bacaloglu signs an agreement with Benito Mussolini, founding the National Italo-Romanian Fascist Movement.
 3 March – The Convention of Romanian–Polish Defensive Alliance is signed in Bucharest, which came into force on 25 July, cementing the Polish–Romanian alliance.
 8 May – At the congress of the Socialist Party of Romania, the pro-Bolshevik faction affirms control of the party, which consequently joins Communist International and is renamed the Romanian Communist Party.
 12 May – The police arrest the leaders of the Romanian Communist Party, initiating the Dealul Spirii Trial.
 6 July – The Hungarian Union is founded with Sámuel Jósika as its first president.
 20 July – The Victory Medal is established, a design subsequently copied by France in the 1914–1918 Inter-Allied Victory medal.
 13 December –  100 people die when a building is bombed in Bolhrad.

Births
 5 January – Tissa David, animator, designer of Raggedy Ann (died 2012).
 14 February – Toma Arnăuțoiu, officer who led a group of anti-communist resistance fighters from 1949 to 1958, executed at Jilava Prison in 1959.
 17 February – Vera Clejan, literary critic and translator (died 2013).
 10 March – Lisa Ferraday, model and actor (died  2004).
 21 June – Greta Deligdisch, advocate for Holocaust survivors (died 2020).
 9 August – Lola Bobesco, violinist (died 2003). 
 24 October – Veronica Schwefelberg, pen name Veronica Porumbacu, poet and translator (died 1977).
 25 October – Prince Michael (died 2017).

Deaths
 13 December –  Ana Conta-Kernbach, writer and women's rights activist (born 1865).

References

Years of the 20th century in Romania
1920s in Romania
 
Romania
Romania